Bawan is a large village and corresponding community development block in Hardoi district of Uttar Pradesh, India. It is located 10 km west of Hardoi, on the south side of the road to Bazpur-Naktaura and the Sai Ghat. Bawan was historically the seat of a pargana since at least the time of the Mughal Emperor Akbar, and it is also the site of a mela held in honour of Darshan Debi on the first Sunday of Bhadon, at a site called the Suraj Kund. The main staple crops here are wheat, rice, and gram. Markets are held on Mondays and Thursdays. As of 2011, the population of Bawan is 13,524, in 2,230 households.

History 
According to tradition, Bawan was founded by a person named Rajpal before the reign of Rama in Ayodhya. It is said that later, the 11th-century Muslim folk hero Ghazi Sayyid Salar Masud sent a force from Kannauj to conquer Bawan, and that the Muslim soldiers who died in the ensuing battle were buried near the Suraj Kund. Another one of Salar Masud's companions, Makhdum Abdul Qasim, is said to have fasted here for 40 days, and his shrine is still visited on Thursday evenings by people who leave sweetmeats and light small lamps in his memory.

At the turn of the 20th century, Bawan was described as a large village both in population and in physical area, with a population of 3,800 people as of the 1901 census. Of these, 1,021 were Muslim, while the main Hindu caste was the Brahmins. The Darshan Debi mela, which had previously been "of considerable importance", was still observed but its attendance was smaller than it had been in the past. The weekly veneration of Makhdum Abdul Qasim's shrine was also noted, with an attendance of about 200 people at the time. Bawan hosted a market twice per week at the time.

The 1961 census recorded Bawan as comprising 6 hamlets, with a total population of 4,993 (2,704 male and 2,289 female), in 968 households and 703 physical houses. The area of the village was given as 2,478 acres.

The 1981 census recorded Bawan as having a population of 7,384, in 1,306 households, and covering an area of 992.32 hectares.

Villages 
Bawan CD block has the following 140 villages:

References 

Villages in Hardoi district